Going Places is a 1938 American musical comedy film directed by Ray Enright.  Dick Powell plays a sporting goods salesman who is forced to pose as a famous horseman as part of his scheme to boost sales and gets entangled in his lies.

The film was nominated for the Academy Award for Best Original Song for the song "Jeepers Creepers", premiered in this movie by Louis Armstrong, who sings it to a horse.

Two earlier films, both entitled The Hottentot (1929) and The Hottentot (1922 silent version), were based on the same source.

Plot
A sports store clerk poses as a famous jockey as an advertising stunt, but gets more than he bargained for.

Cast

 Dick Powell as Peter Mason
 Anita Louise as Ellen Parker
 Allen Jenkins as "Droopy"
 Ronald Reagan as Jack Withering
 Walter Catlett as Franklin Dexter
 Harold Huber as Maxie Miller
 Larry Williams as Frank Kendall
 Thurston Hall as Col. Harvey Withering
 Minna Gombell as Cora Withering 
 Joyce Compton as The Colonel's Mistress
 Robert Warwick as Walter Frome
 John Ridgely as Desk Clerk
 Joe Cunningham as Hotel Night Clerk
 Eddie "Rochester" Anderson as George 
 George Reed as Withering's Butler
 Louis Armstrong as Gabriel the Trainer
 Maxine Sullivan as Specialty Singer
 unbilled players include Ward Bond and the Dandridge Sisters

Accolades
The song "Jeepers Creepers" was nominated for the American Film Institute list AFI's 100 Years...100 Songs.

Johnny Mercer and Harry Warren won an Oscar nomination for Best Song for "Jeepers Creepers". The song later would be sung in Yankee Doodle Dandy (1942), The Day of the Locust (1975), The Cheap Detective (1978) and the horror thriller Jeepers Creepers (2001).

References

External links
 
 
 
 

1938 films
1938 musical comedy films
American musical comedy films
Films directed by Ray Enright
American horse racing films
Warner Bros. films
American black-and-white films
1930s English-language films
1930s American films